Lake Eden (also referred to as Eden Lake) is a small, recreational lake in Alberta, Canada.

History
In the early 1950s it was named Lake Eden by the owners of the Lake Eden Fur Farm, whose farm sat adjacent to the lake.

References

Eden
Parkland County